The Young Muslim Association (YMA) is an Islamic organization initially founded by Imam Mohamad Jawad Chirri at the Islamic Center of America (Detroit), currently established in Dearborn, Michigan. The YMA regularly scheduled programs and events throughout the year; with Friday programs which occurred all year long in the evenings. Its headquarters was in Dearborn, Michigan, United States in 2008. It is led by Imam Ahmad Hammoud.

The stated goals of the YMA were to promote an Islamic way of life for Muslim youths. The organization tries to enhance the leadership qualities of young people within the community.

References

External links
Young American Muslims hope to help, educate USA Today article

Islamic education
Islamic youth organizations
Islamic organizations based in the United States
Arab and Islamic culture in Dearborn, Michigan
Youth organizations based in the United States